Avi Nash is an American actor.  He played Siddiq in the AMC television series The Walking Dead (2017–2020).

Early life 
Nash was born in the United States, his father is Indo-Guyanese and his mother is from Mumbai.

Nash started acting in senior year of high school off a dare to audition for the school play; prior to this, he identified primarily as a visual artist.

Nash began attending Stanford University when he was 17 years old, performing with the Stanford Shakespeare Company. He was classmates with Young the Giant's Sameer Gadhia, who encouraged Nash to seriously pursue acting dropping out himself to pursue a professional music career. So, after freshman year, Nash left Stanford to attend acting school under Anupam Kher at Actor Prepares in Mumbai for six months. However, he returned to complete his degree, citing conflicting feelings between his various interests. He returned to Stanford University and majored in Mathematical and Computational Sciences while studying architecture.

Nash trained in theatre at the London Academy of Music and Dramatic Art and graduated with an MA in 2016.

Career 
Prior to acting, he was a cook in a closed door restaurant (puerta cerradas) that he ran out of a hostel in Buenos Aires and conducted bike tours.

He made his feature film debut in Learning to Drive alongside Sir Ben Kingsley and Patricia Clarkson, directed by Spanish director Isabel Coixet. The film premiered at the 2014 Toronto International Film Festival, where it won First Runner Up for the People’s Choice Award.

In 2017, Nash portrayed AMC's The Walking Dead's first male Muslim-American character, Siddiq, in season 8 of the show. As a result, he has attended different comic book conventions throughout the years, including Walker Stalker Con.

Personal life 
Nash can read and write in Devanagari and Urdu. He studied Hindi at Stanford and took his acting class in India completely in Hindi. Nash learned Portuguese from his ex-girlfriend while briefly living near the Brazilian border.

Filmography

Film

Television

References

External links

Living people
American male television actors
American male film actors
American male actors of Indian descent
American people of Guyanese descent
Year of birth missing (living people)